Rudi van Houts (born 16 January 1984, in Luyksgestel) is a Dutch former professional road cyclist and mountain biker.

Van Houts finished 10th overall at the Giro del Capo in Cape Town in 2007, finishing 3:54 behind the winner. He finished 12th in the 2008 UCI World Mountain Bike Championships held in Val di Sole. Later that year he also qualified for the 2008 Summer Olympics in Beijing, where he finished in 34th.  At the 2012 Summer Olympics he finished in 17th.

Major results
2005
 1st  Cross-country, European Under-23 Mountain Bike Championships
2006
 2nd  Cross-country, European Under-23 Mountain Bike Championships
2007
 10th Overall Giro del Capo
2009
 3rd  Mixed relay, European Mountain Bike Championships
2010
 1st  National Cross-country Championships
2011
 1st  National Cross-country Championships

See also
 List of Dutch Olympic cyclists

References

1984 births
Living people
Dutch male cyclists
Cyclists at the 2008 Summer Olympics
Cyclists at the 2012 Summer Olympics
Cyclists at the 2016 Summer Olympics
Olympic cyclists of the Netherlands
People from Bergeijk
Cross-country mountain bikers
Dutch mountain bikers
Cyclists from North Brabant